CNN International Europe/Middle East/Africa is the European, Middle East and African version of CNN's "CNN International" satellite and cable television network. It features many locally produced shows.

Between 1996 and 2003, to differentiate it from the other feeds, the network logo on the lower-right hand of the screen had a static globe with the continents Europe and Africa facing the audiences.

Programming
In the earlier days of CNN International, the program line-up was exactly the same in every region CNN International was broadcast in.  However, in the late-1990s, the line-up started varying among regions with some programs exclusively broadcasting to the Europe, Middle East and Africa only such as CNN This Morning (European edition) and World Business This Morning. Programming variations also included showtimes of selected magazine programmes during the weekend to allow audiences to watch them at a similar time slot to their counterparts elsewhere.

Today, the line-up is almost exactly the same in every region once again with differences limited to advertising and weather updates during the breaks.

Broadcasting
Although this version of CNN International is intended primarily for European, African, and Middle Eastern viewers, a live feed of it is made available on selected aircraft of participating airlines like Emirates and Cathay Pacific regardless of their current position (subject to legal restrictions of the country these aircraft are flying over at the moment).

On 1 September 2021, CNN International was removed from the Virgin Media cable platform in the UK. It continued to be available free on satellite, but it was removed from the Freesat platform.

On 16 November 2021, CNN International was also removed from Virgin Media Ireland.

Switchover to High definition and 16:9
CNN International HD is the high definition simulcast feed of the channel broadcasting at 1920x1080i, which was launched in September 2012. Prior to June 3, 2013, only programming from CNN/U.S. was available natively in HD, while shows made for CNN International were produced in 4:3 576i. In February 2013, the European SD feed of CNN International began broadcasting in widescreen by downscaling the HD feed, which resulted in all 4:3-native programming being broadcast in pillarbox until the June 3 switchover, finalising on June 17 of the same year, when the switchover was completed.

On June 28, 2016, CNN International HD was launched for Sky customers in the UK (including on Freesat from Sky), on channel 506 or 579, making the next news channel launch in the 600s, as it is next to the GOD Channel.  The HD version is available free-to-air within the British Isles, and is provided on satellite and IPTV services, and also live-streamed for U.K. users (and geo-blocked outside the U.K.), through CNN International's official U.K. video site. However, viewers with non-proprietary Freesat boxes will need to add the channel manually as Freesat does not market CNN International HD publicly as part of its offerings.

References

External links
satellites for CNN International Europe

CNN
Europe, the Middle East and Africa
Television channels and stations established in 1984